Bryoria hengduanensis is a species of lichen of the genus Bryoria. It was described as new to science in 2003 by lichenologists Li-Song Wang and Hiroshi Harada. The Hengduan Mountains is a region of high Bryoria biodiversity, as 24 species are known from this area.

It is black in parts near its base, and pale brown near the tips. The lichen has linear pseudocyphellae (with a depressed or fissured surface indentation) that twist into long spirals. Soralia, apothecia, and pycnidia are absent. Bryoria hengduanensis contains usnic and fumarprotocetraric acids.

References

Lichens described in 2003
Lichen species
Lichens of China
hengduanensis